Dendryphantes nicator is a species of jumping spider in the genus Dendryphantes that lives in Yemen. It was first described by Wanda Wesołowska & Antonius van Harten in 1994.

References

Spiders described in 1994
Invertebrates of the Arabian Peninsula
Salticidae
Spiders of Asia